Rosewood is a fictional town in Pennsylvania that serves as the main setting for the Pretty Little Liars book series and television adaptation. The town is suggested to be loosely based on real-life Rosemont, Pennsylvania.

History

In print 
Rosewood was founded by William W. Rosewood and, as a Main Line town, has a long history of prestige associated with the railroad industry of the 1800s. The majority of its residents are upper-class Americans, and many families, such as the Hastings, have had significant wealth dating back to that decade. Rosewood consists of farms, cornfields, pastures, and barns that have since been converted into apartments and other buildings. 

Several homes of the franchise's characters are located near forested areas. Emily's backyard is bordered by the woods, Spencer and Alison's neighborhood is surrounded by a small forest, and the Kahns' vast property is also bordered by a forest. However, the protagonists appear to live in very different sections of the suburb. Though it is strongly leaning towards the rural end, Rosewood appears to be a fairly large town. The town also has an upscale shopping mall called the King James Mall.

On screen 

Rosewood is located about 20 miles outside Philadelphia and is also the fictitious Ravenswood from the sequel television series of the same name. A mental institution, Radley Sanitarium, was located East of Rosewood in Darkette County. The city has its own printed newspaper, The Rosewood Observer. The Apple Rose Grille restaurant is a redesigned set of Luke's Diner, a location of the WB series Gilmore Girls. The current population is of 7,989 inhabitants.

Most scenes in the television series are shot using the exteriors of the Warner Bros. studio backlot in Burbank, while the interior scenes are filmed separately on nearby sound stages.

Locations

In both books and television 
 The Church
 Radley Sanitarium and later Radley Hotel
 Hollis College
 Snookers
 The Kissing Rock
 Rive Gauche
 Shady Pines Cemetery
 Rosewood Community Hospital
 Rosewood Country Club
 Rosewood Police Department

Only in the books 
 The Preserve at Addison-Stevens
 Rosewood Day
 Ruff House Grooming
 Mighty Quill Library
 King James Mall
 Rosewood Bowl-O-Rama

Only in the television series

 Rosewood High
 Rosewood Mall
 Rosewood Movie Theater
 Edgewood Motor Court (also known as the Rosewood Motel)
 Diva Dish
 Speed Demon Express
 Wright's Playground
 The Greenhouse
 The Haunted House
 Apple Rose Grille
 COFFEA Espresso Shop
 Hollis Bar & Grill
 Lucky Leon's Cupcakes
 The Brew
 Lost Woods Resort
 Welby State Psychiatric Hospital
 Dr. Sullivan's Office

Residents 
 Only in the television series

Inhabitants 
 Emily Fields
 Pam Fields 
 Grace DiLaurentis-Fields
 Lily DiLaurentis-Fields
 Aria Montgomery
 Ella Montgomery
 Byron Montgomery
 Ezra Fitz
 Veronica Hastings
 Peter Hastings
 Jenna Marshall

Dead residents
 Ian Thomas 
 Maya St. Germain 
 Jessica DiLaurentis 
 Wayne Fields
 Charlotte DiLaurentis 
 Sara Harvey

Former Residents 
 Meredith Sorenson 
 Maggie Cutler 
 Malcom Cutler 
 Wesley Fitzgerald (moved back home)
 Melissa Hastings (moved to Londres)
 Jason DiLaurentis 
 Kenneth DiLaurentis 
 Mike Montgomery (moved to university)
 Mona Vanderwaal (moved to Beacon Heights)
 Alison DiLaurentis (moved to Beacon Heights)
 Spencer Hastings (escaped)
 Toby Cavanaugh (escaped)

References

Fictional populated places in Pennsylvania
Pretty Little Liars (franchise)